Thomas Bullaker, OFM (also John Baptist) (born at Chichester about the year 1604; executed at Tyburn, 12 October 1642) was an English Franciscan Catholic priest. He is a Catholic martyr, beatified in 1987.

Life
He was the only son of a pious and well-to-do physician of Chichester; his parents were both fervent Catholics. At an early age he was sent to the English College at St-Omer, and from there he went to Valladolid in Spain to complete his studies.

Convinced of his vocation to the Franciscan Order, after much anxious deliberation, he received the habit at Abrojo, and a few years later, in 1628, was ordained priest. Having left Spain for the English mission, he landed at Plymouth, but was immediately seized and imprisoned. Released after two weeks, Bullaker by order of the provincial in England, Father Thomas of St. Francis, worked for nearly twelve years among the poor Catholics of London.

On 11 September 1642, Bullaker was seized while celebrating Mass in the house of a pious benefactress. He was condemned to be drawn on a hurdle to Tyburn and there hanged, drawn, and quartered, and beheaded.

References

Attribution

1600s births
1642 deaths
English Franciscans
17th-century English Roman Catholic priests
English beatified people
People executed by Stuart England by hanging, drawing and quartering
17th-century venerated Christians
Year of birth uncertain
Year of birth unknown
People from Chichester
Executed people from West Sussex
Executed Roman Catholic priests
Eighty-five martyrs of England and Wales